Physical may refer to:
Physical examination, a regular overall check-up with a doctor
Physical (Olivia Newton-John album), 1981
"Physical" (Olivia Newton-John song)
Physical (Gabe Gurnsey album)
"Physical" (Alcazar song) (2004)
"Physical" (Enrique Iglesias song) (2014)
"Physical" (Dua Lipa song) (2020)
"Physical (You're So)", a 1980 song by Adam & the Ants, the B side to "Dog Eat Dog"
Physical (TV series), an American television series
Physical: 100, a Korean reality show on Netflix

See also